Ke Wang is a Chinese TV series released in 1990.  It stars Zhang Kaili and Li Xuejian. "Ke wang" in Chinese means "aspiration", "yearning", thus the theme of the series concerns human nature. "Ke wang" tells a story of human nature with the era's background, revealing people's eager desire for traditional values, for love, friendship, and a good life.

Among the most watched Chinese television shows in history, the series has been known to achieved unprecedented television ratings and viewers in China.

Plot
The series is set in the age of "Wenge" (the Great Proletarian Cultural Revolution), concerning the love story of two couples. The main character is called Liu Huifangn.

Reputation and awards

Here are some awards this series owned:
"Excellent Drama Series" of Golden Eagle Award, 1991 
"Best actor" of Golden Eagle Award——Li Xuejian, 1991
"Best actress" of Golden Eagle Award——Zhang Kaili, 1991
"Excellent long TV series" of Flying Apsaras Award, 1991

Influence
This series was well known as a historic milestone in the development of Chinese TV series.

References

1990 Chinese television series debuts
Television shows set in Beijing
Mandarin-language television shows
Chinese drama television series